Astrebla is a small genus of xerophytic (adapted to survive in an environment with little liquid water) grasses found only in Australia. They are the dominant grass across much of the continent. They are commonly known as Mitchell grass after Scottish explorer, Thomas Mitchell (1792-1855), who first collected a specimen near Bourke in New South Wales.

Mitchell grasses are deep-rooted and become dormant during drought, allowing them to survive extended periods without rainfall.

They are commonly found clumped together and reaching one metre high, providing habitat for organisms such as mammals.

 Species

See also
 List of Poaceae genera

References

Chloridoideae
Bunchgrasses of Australasia
Poales of Australia
Forages
Poaceae genera